Álvaro Velho (15th-16th century, born in Barreiro, Portugal) was a Portuguese sailor or soldier who took part in the first Portuguese expedition by sea to India, led by Vasco da Gama in 1497.

Velho is one of the purported authors of the anonymous Journal of Vasco Da Gama's trip of 1497 (the other being João de Sá). This work survives in a single manuscript copy preserved at the Biblioteca Pública Municipal of Porto and first published in Porto in 1838 by Diogo Kopke.

In 1945, historian Franz Hümmerich identified the author of this manuscript with an Álvaro Velho who had spent eight years in Guinea and provided information about the Gambia region to Valentim Fernandes. However, more recent studies by Carmen Radulet have exposed weaknesses in this theory and attributed the Journal with more certainty to scrivener João de Sá.

References 

Editions of the Journal:
 Diogo Kopke and Antonio da Costa Paiva (eds.), "Roteiro da viagem que em descobrimento da India pelo Cabo da Boa Esperança fez dom Vasco da Gama em 1497": Segundo um manuscripto da Bibliotheca publica portuense, Porto: Typographia Commercial Portuense, 1838 (first edition of the manuscript, in Portuguese). Scan available at Biblioteca Brasiliana Mindlin
 Ernest George Ravenstein (ed.), A journal of the first voyage of Vasco da Gama, 1497–1499, London:Hakluyt Society, 1898 (first English translation). Scan available at Archive.org

Portuguese travel writers
Maritime history of Portugal
People from Barreiro, Portugal
15th-century Portuguese people
16th-century Portuguese people
Portuguese explorers
15th-century explorers
Explorers of Asia
Portuguese male writers
Portuguese Renaissance writers